Tarus Mateen, also known as Taurus Mateen and Tarus Dorsey Kinch (born October 21, 1967, Bakersfield, California) is an American double-bass and electric bassist, who works in jazz, pop, and R&B idioms.

Biography
Mateen was a child prodigy on bass and went on a tour of the Caribbean when he was twelve years old. He received his bachelor's degree from Morehouse College, where he also played on the side, then relocated to New York City in 1988. He worked with Betty Carter, Marlon Jordan, Roy Hargrove, Eddie Harris, Kenny Burrell, Milt Jackson, Mark Whitfield, Tim Warfield, Rodney Kendrick, and Terence Blanchard in the early 1990s. Later in the decade he worked with Kenny Barron, Bobbi Humphrey, Marc Cary, Stefon Harris, and Greg Osby. In the 2000s he worked with Bernard Purdie, Nasheet Waits, Stanley Cowell, Mark Shim, Jacky Terrasson, Michael Marcus, Logan Richardson, and Jason Moran among others.

Mateen has also worked as a session musician and touring bassist for pop, soul, and R&B artists, including Christina Aguilera, OutKast, Toni Braxton, Goodie Mob, Q-Tip, Lauryn Hill, Ghostface Killah, Ice Cube, and The Roots.

Discography

With Terence Blanchard
The Malcolm X Jazz Suite (Columbia, 1993)
With Betty Carter
Droppin' Things (Verve, 1990)
With Jason Moran
Facing Left (Blue Note, 2000)
Black Stars (Blue Note, 2001)
The Bandwagon (Blue Note, 2003)
Same Mother (Blue Note, 2005)
Artist in Residence (Blue Note, 2006)
Ten (Blue Note, 2010)
All Rise: A Joyful Elegy for Fats Waller (Blue Note, 2014)
With Jacky Terrasson
Kindred (Blue Note, 2001)

References

American jazz double-bassists
Male double-bassists
American jazz bass guitarists
American male bass guitarists
Musicians from Bakersfield, California
1967 births
Living people
Jazz musicians from California
Guitarists from California
21st-century double-bassists
21st-century American male musicians
American male jazz musicians